"Bad Ambassador" is a song by the Divine Comedy. It was released as the second single from the album Regeneration. A live version of the track serves as the A-side on the second CD single.

CD-ROM content on the first disc includes the promotional video. Filmed in black and white, it features a Bigfoot working in a paper factory and dreaming of a better life with a co-worker.

The four live tracks from the second CD and 7" were recorded at Oxford Brookes University on 21 March 2001. "Pictures of Matchstick Men" is a cover version of the Status Quo song from 1968.

Track listing 

2001 singles
The Divine Comedy (band) songs
Songs written by Neil Hannon
2001 songs
Parlophone singles